TRB Two – also known as TRB2 – is the second studio album by Tom Robinson Band. It was recorded days after the original drummer, Dolphin Taylor, left the band. The TRB disbanded four months after its release. Steve Ridgeway designed the cover.

Songs
The album was dedicated to Mrs. Mary Towers, the mother of Liddle Towers. Liddle Towers was an amateur boxer who had died in police custody in 1976 - his case was the subject of "Blue Murder".

"Black Angel" was originally recorded as "Sweet Black Angel" by Robinson's first band, Café Society, on their self-titled debut album in 1975. "Law and Order" was co-written by Nick Plytas who joined the TRB as a temporary keyboard player from April to July 1978.

Robinson and Danny Kustow believe "Bully for You" inspired " Another Brick in the Wall Part 2" by Pink Floyd, with whom the band shared a manager and label. "There's no question [the song's repeated] 'We don't need no aggravation' was in the air around [Floyd lyricist] Roger Waters", said the former. "The truth of it is that I had a really good idea for a chorus and we didn't make the most of it. If 'Bully for You' had started with, 'We don't need no aggravation,' how much better would it have been? Roger's skills as a writer were far more developed than my own. He put a great idea to better use, so fair play to him."

Reception
Smash Hits said, "This is far superior to the last album and the TRB are developing into a very fine rock band. This album captures more of their live power, but the increasing sophistication of the songs means less immediate impact."

Track listing 
All tracks composed by Tom Robinson; except where indicated

"All Right All Night" (Robinson, Danny Kustow, Dolphin Taylor, Ian Parker) – 2:59
"Why Should I Mind" (Robinson, Danny Kustow) – 3:01
"Black Angel" – 4:02
"Let My People Be" – 4:07
"Blue Murder" – 5:02
"Bully for You" (music: Peter Gabriel; lyrics: Robinson) – 3:20
"Crossing over the Road" (Robinson, Danny Kustow, Ian Parker) – 3:39
"Sorry Mr. Harris" – 2:43
"Law and Order" (music: Robinson, Nick Plytas, Taylor; lyrics: Robinson, Dolphin Taylor) – 2:35
"Days of Rage" (Robinson, Dolphin Taylor) – 3:33
"Hold Out" – 4:10

Charts

Personnel
Tom Robinson Band
Tom Robinson – vocals, bass
Danny Kustow – guitar, backing vocals
Ian "Quince" Parker – keyboards; vocals on "Law & Order"
Preston Heyman – drums, triangle, backing vocals
with:
Carol Grimes, Kasim Sulton, Niamh Chambers, Barry St. John – backing "high" vocals
Technical
Bill Price – preparation
Paul Libsom, Tom Edmonds – engineer
Julie Harris, Steve Ridgeway – cover design

References

1979 albums
Albums produced by Todd Rundgren
EMI Records albums
Tom Robinson Band albums